is a Japanese football player who plays for Oita Trinita in the J2 League.

Club career
Born in Fukuyama, Hiroshima, Kaneda was a product of Sanfrecce Hiroshima's youth ranks where he was teammates with players like Tsubasa Yokotake and Kenta Uchida.

In 2008, Kaneda signed a professional contract with Ehime F.C. and had been coached by goalkeeper coach Akira Yamanaka, before he was then replaced by former goalkeeper Yoshimi Sasahara. Kaneda stayed for five years in Ehime and had only made a total of three appearances.

In 2014, Kaneda completed a permanent move to Montedio Yamagata where he spent two years as a substitute goalkeeper.

At the start of the 2016 season, Kaneda moved to the newly promoted Avispa Fukuoka.

Club statistics
Updated to 23 February 2018.

References

External links

Profile at Oita Trinita

1990 births
Living people
Association football people from Hiroshima Prefecture
Japanese footballers
J1 League players
J2 League players
Ehime FC players
Montedio Yamagata players
Avispa Fukuoka players
Oita Trinita players
Association football goalkeepers